Rasmus Gozzi is a Swedish singer and songwriter. He started his music career in 2016, and has co-written songs with Louise Andersson Bodin. He has also worked with Lazee and Sean Kingston.

Discography

Albums

Singles

Notes

References

Living people
1993 births
Swedish singer-songwriters
Swedish male singers